John Michael Doar (December 3, 1921 – November 11, 2014) was an American lawyer and senior counsel with the law firm Doar Rieck Kaley & Mack in New York City. During the administrations of presidents John F. Kennedy and Lyndon B. Johnson, he served first as Deputy Assistant Attorney General for Civil Rights from 1961 to 1965, and then as head of the division from 1965 until 1967. He led the government's response to events such as the admission and protection of James Meredith, the first black student admitted to the University of Mississippi, as well as the evolving response to the civil rights movement promoting integration and voter registration in the South. Additionally, in 1973–74, he served as the lead special counsel for the U.S. House Judiciary Committee's impeachment inquiry staff during the impeachment process against Richard Nixon.

Early life
Doar was born in New Richmond, Wisconsin, the son of Mae and William Doar. In 1940, Doar graduated from St. Paul Academy and Summit School in Saint Paul, Minnesota. He served in the United States Army Air Forces during World War II and was a pilot. He graduated with an A.B. from the School of Public and International Affairs (now Princeton School of Public and International Affairs) at Princeton University in 1944 after completing a senior thesis titled "An Analysis of Farmer Cooperatives, 1918–1946." He then received an LL.B. from the University of California-Berkeley Boalt Hall School of Law. From 1950 to 1960, Doar then worked in his family's law firm in New Richmond, Wisconsin.

Civil rights career

A Republican, Doar served as Deputy Assistant and then Assistant Attorney General for Civil Rights in the U.S. Dept. of Justice, from 1960 to 1967, during which time he was involved in several of the most significant events of the American civil rights movement. In 1961 he operated in Montgomery, Alabama, along with his assistant, John Seigenthaler, to protect the Freedom Riders.  In 1962, he confronted Ross Barnett over Barnett's attempts to prevent James Meredith from entering the segregated University of Mississippi. He also prosecuted Collie Leroy Wilkins for federal civil rights violations in the murder of Viola Liuzzo, gaining conviction by an all-white jury in Alabama. In 1963, he calmed an angry mob after the assassination of civil rights leader Medgar Evers, murdered outside his home.

Doar prosecuted the federal case for civil rights violations against the people who were accused of murdering Andrew Goodman, James Chaney and Michael Schwerner, young civil rights workers in Mississippi. He had earlier contributed to drafting the Civil Rights Act of 1964, which Lyndon Johnson signed to try to secure constitutional rights for all citizens. In March 1965, Doar was the first to arrive in Montgomery, Alabama, during the third of the Selma to Montgomery marches. He walked into Montgomery half a block ahead of the march in his capacity as Assistant Attorney General.

Doar left the government in 1967. He went into private practice and worked for Bedford Stuyvesant Development Corporation. From late 1968 to 1969 he was president of the New York City Board of Education. During his tenure he supported gender discrimination, opposing the entry of girls to all-boy high schools.

Nixon impeachment inquiry
Doar was hired in December 1973 to be the lead special counsel for the House Judiciary Committee's impeachment inquiry staff during the impeachment process against Richard Nixon. He supervised a team which in due course grew to 100 persons, including lawyers, investigators, clerks and stenographers. To minimize leaks he established strict rules of conduct that included this directive: "The staff of the impeachment inquiry shall not discuss with anyone outside the staff either the substance or procedure of their work or that of the committee."

Later life and death
He then started a law firm in New York City: Doar, Rieck, Kaley, & Mack.

Doar died in New York City from congestive heart failure, aged 92. He was survived by his children: Gael, Michael, Robert (a former Commissioner of the New York City Human Resources Administration) and Burke.

Gallery

Representation in film and television
The 1988 film Mississippi Burning drew from the murders of the three civil rights workers.
Episode from the Discovery Channel series, "US Marshals: Mission in Mississippi" (1997). Interview with Doar about his role in Justice Department effort to enroll James Meredith at University of Mississippi in 1962. Doar and Chief US Marshal James McShane were given the job of enrolling Meredith by Attorney General Robert Kennedy.
In the 2014 film Selma, he is portrayed by Alessandro Nivola.

Legacy and honors
Doar was awarded the Presidential Medal of Freedom in 2012.

References

Further reading

External links
Biography of John Doar – Doar Rieck Kaley & Mack

Q&A with John Doar – C-SPAN interview, January 12, 2009
John Doar papers from Princeton University Library. Special Collections

1921 births
2014 deaths
American men's basketball players
Civil rights movement
Kennedy administration personnel
Lawyers from Minneapolis
Lawyers from New York City
New York (state) lawyers
People from New Richmond, Wisconsin
Presidential Medal of Freedom recipients
Princeton Tigers men's basketball players
Selma to Montgomery marches
UC Berkeley School of Law alumni
United States Army Air Forces pilots of World War II
United States Assistant Attorneys General for the Civil Rights Division
Watergate scandal investigators
Wisconsin lawyers
Recipients of the President's Award for Distinguished Federal Civilian Service